Adam Craig Dale (born 30 December 1968) is a former Australian cricketer who played in two Test matches and 30 One Day Internationals between 1997 and 2000. He played in first-class and List A cricket for Queensland Bulls and in club cricket for North Melbourne Cricket Club, Heidelberg Cricket Club, Northcote Cricket Club, Old Paradians Cricket Club and Research Cricket Club.

From a short, ambling run-up, Dale delivered medium-paced outswingers with nagging accuracy. He therefore become known more as an economical bowler in one-day cricket, although he was selected for two Tests throughout his career and was very successful for Queensland in the first-class arena. He is best remembered however for taking one of the greatest catches ever seen in the game of cricket whilst playing for Queensland in the summer of 1997–98.

He played grade cricket for the Wynnum-Manly Cricket Club in Brisbane, and premier cricket for Northcote, Heidelberg Cricket Club, North Melbourne and Melbourne in Melbourne, over a long career which spanned twenty-six years from 1985–86 to 2010–11.

References

External links
 

1968 births
Living people
Australia One Day International cricketers
Australia Test cricketers
Queensland cricketers
Melbourne Cricket Club cricketers
Australian cricketers
Cricketers from Melbourne
People from Ivanhoe, Victoria